Pentalisa was a territory which was located in the region of Shekhawati, India. The group of 45 villages under Udaipurwati was known as Pentalisa. The Bhojraj Ji Ka Shekhawat Rajputs ruled over two territories, Pentalisa and Panch Pana.

Constituent villages
The 45 villages of Pentalisa were:

Udaipurwati,
Jhajhar, granted to Kunwar Purshottamdas Ji, elder son of Raja Todermal of Udaipurwati.
Chirana, site of a magnificent castle.
Khirod, founded by Kunwar Amar Singh and Kunwar Ram Singh, sons of Salehdi Singh, they built a castle in 1825 samwat.
Gudha, also known as Gudhagorji, established on Margshirsh shukla 5, samwat 1705 by Thakur Jhunjhar Singh Ji, son of Raja Todermal of Udaipurwati. Thakur sahab Shri. Virendra Pratap Singh Shekhawat former MLA is the member of the noble family of Gudha Gorji, is present.
Bhojgarh,(Thakur Devi Singh son of Thakur Ashu Singh ji)
Papda (Hukam Singh),
Bhorki (Bagh Singh),
Baghor,
Nangli Saledi Singh
Nangal,
Posana,
Inderpura, Thakur Sardar Singh received his patrimony of Inderpura. He was the son of Jhunjhar Singh of Gudha and grandson of Raja Todermal of Udaipurwati.
Khojas,
Pachlangi,
Papda (Chajoo Singh)
Jodhpura,
Bagholi, founded  by Thakur sahab Anop Singh ji
Sefragonwar,
Chinchadoli,
Rasolpur,
Barau, Barau was conquered from  Thaku Kusal Singh son of Thakur Jagram Singh
Gura, founded in samwat 1805 by Thakur Balu Singh son of Thakur Roop Singh and grandson of Thakur Jhunjhar Singh of Gudha.
Punkh,
Kishorpura, Kishorpura named after Thakur Kishor Singh (son of Thakur Jhunjhar Singh of Gudha). He  received his patrimony of Kishorpura.
Nevari,
Dippura,
Chanwara,
Chavsari,
Badagaon,
Kakrana,
Kedh, in Samwat 1777, Kedh was conquered from Kaimkhani Nawab by 
(Descendants of Thakur Salehdi Singh 1687-1767): Kedh, founded by Kunwar Gopal Singh son of Thakur Jagram Singh.
Thakur Gopal Singh son of Thakur Jagram Singh established bamlas in 1771 Besakh sudi teej 
Jakhal,
Doodiya,
Chapoli, Raja Jatan Singh Ji received his patrimony of Chhapoli. He was the son of Raja Bagh Singh Ji and grandson of Raja Jhunjhar Singh Ji of Gudha.

Surpura Saray,
Girawadi,
Khoh, founded in last of 18th century by Thakur Balu Singh son of Thakur Roop Singh and grandson of Thakur Jhunjhar Singh of Gudha.
Dhamora,
Mandawara,
Gothara,
Mohanwari (Moonwari),
Hukampura,
BhojnagarLorada Lohargal
Khudania
∗Titanwar

External links
 https://web.archive.org/web/20120801195034/http://members.iinet.net.au/~royalty/ips/misc/shekhawat.html

Shekhawati